Ramlee Awang Murshid (born November 4, 1967 in Papar, Malaysia) is a Malaysian novelist.

Life and career
He attended in the Kapayan Primary School in Kota Kinabalu from 1974 to 1979. He graduated from Sabah College in 1984 after 4 years there. He furthered his studies from the National University of Malaysia, where he obtained his Certificate of Communication in 2000 as well as his Bachelor of Arts (honours) degree in Communication.

He had involved himself in theatre since his teenage years, at times as a director, playwright or actor. He was also a former reporter for Radio Televisyen Malaysia spanning 20 years from 1986 to 2010. His reporting job, which sometimes brought him to travel to various countries, played a significant role in his writing. Some of those works, which are set in faraway countries such as Japan, were inspired by his travels.

Personal life
He is married to Dayang Aminah Datuk Aliudin since 14 February 1990. They have one child together named Muhammad Aizuddin Haiqal.

Awards
 First runner for his novel Igauan Maut (1995) in Adult Novel Writing, hosted by Dewan Bahasa dan Pustaka, Kota Kinabalu branch.
 Sabah Literature Award 1995/1996 from his novel Igauan Maut
 First runner up for Pei Pan novel, hosted by Sako Novel National Award 2002.
 Sabah Literature Award 2004/2005 via novel Pei Pan
 Sabah Literature Award 2006/2007 via novel Bagaikan Puteri (Like a princess)
 Berita Harian Reader's Favourite Book Award 2009 via novel Hijab Sang Pencinta (2nd Runner Up)

Works

Adaptations of works 
A film adaptation of one of Ramlee's more famous works, Tombiruo: Penunggu Rimba, was co-produced by Astro Shaw, book publisher Karangkraf, Ideate Media and Ramlee's own production company Layar Sunan. The film was released to cinemas on 16 October 2017. The four companies are also in the process of making a film adaptation of another work titled Bagaikan Puteri, a historical fiction novel surrounding a young lady who is flung into the 15th century and ends up falling for an admiral of the Aceh Sultanate.

The thriller novel Mandatori was made into a 6-part miniseries as an exclusive release on Malaysian satellite TV provider Astro's on-demand service Astro First late 2017.

References

Sources
 http://www.kelabram.com/

1967 births
Living people
People from Sabah
Malaysian writers
Malaysian novelists
National University of Malaysia alumni